Haplobasidion is a genus of fungi belonging to the order Hypocreales, unknown family.

The species of this genus are found in Europe.

Species:

Haplobasidion himalayense 
Haplobasidion indicum 
Haplobasidion lelebae 
Haplobasidion musae 
Haplobasidion thalictri

References

Hypocreales incertae sedis
Hypocreales genera